Weirdo Shrine is a studio album by surf rock band La Luz. It was released on August 7, 2015.

Composition
Weirdo Shrine digs into "classic-sounding" surf rock, yielding a "dark spin" on the genre. Doo-wop and "top-notch" rock and roll are also present. 

The album's production is lo-fi and "fuzz-heavy".

Critical reception

Track listing
 "Sleep Till They Die (Health, Life and Fire)" – 3:19
 "You Disappear" – 3:22
 "With Davey" – 2:17
 "Don't Wanna Be Anywhere" – 3:00
 "I Can't Speak" – 3:03
 "Hey Papi" – 1:46
 "I Wanna Be Alone (With You)" – 2:16
 "I'll Be True" – 3:28
 "Black Hole, Weirdo Shrine" – 3:04
 "Oranges" – 2:10
 "True Love Knows" – 3:36

Personnel
Credits adapted from AllMusic.

La Luz
 Shana Cleveland - lead vocals, guitar
 Alice Sandahl - keyboard
 Lena Simon - bass
 Marian Li Pino - drums

References

External links
 official website

La Luz (band) albums
2015 albums
Hardly Art albums